The University of Nebraska system is the public university system in the U.S. state of Nebraska. Founded in 1869 with one campus in Lincoln, the system has four university campuses and operates a two-year technical agriculture college and a high school.

Schools
 The University of Nebraska–Lincoln is the state's flagship, land-grant university with a Carnegie Research I/Research-Extensive status.  It was founded in 1869 as the University of Nebraska.
 The University of Nebraska Omaha is the state's public urban university.  It was founded in 1908 as Omaha University, and joined the University of Nebraska system in 1968.
 The University of Nebraska at Kearney is a university especially focused on undergraduate education, in a smaller setting.  It was founded in 1905 as the Nebraska State Normal School at Kearney, and joined the University of Nebraska system in 1991.
 The University of Nebraska Medical Center is located in Omaha and was founded as the Omaha Medical College, a private medical school, in 1880. It became a part of the University of Nebraska system in 1902. 
 The Nebraska College of Technical Agriculture is located in Curtis, Nebraska and was founded in 1965. It is a two-year degree-granting institution managed by the University of Nebraska pursuant to a 1994 agreement.
 The University of Nebraska High School is an online high school headquartered in Lincoln, Nebraska. It was founded in 1929 as Independent Study High School.

Nebraska Institutes
The University of Nebraska has four interdisciplinary, University-wide institutes operating across the University of Nebraska system.
  Buffett Early Childhood Institute - Samuel J. Meisels, founding executive director
  National Strategic Research Institute - Robert Hinson, USAF Lt. General (ret.), founding executive director
  Robert B. Daugherty Water for Food Global Institute - Peter G. McCornick, executive director
  Rural Futures Institute - Chuck Schroeder, founding executive director

Two of NU's campuses also partner in the Peter Kiewit Institute, a facility in Omaha, Nebraska that houses academic programs from both the University of Nebraska-Lincoln's College of Engineering and the University of Nebraska at Omaha's College of Information Science and Technology.

NU Online Education
Online Worldwide is the virtual connection point to more than 100 online degrees, certificates, endorsements, and minors offered by the four campuses of the University of Nebraska system.

University of Nebraska High School is an accredited, university-based online high school. The online college preparatory curriculum allows students to earn high school credit or a diploma from anywhere around the world.

History
On February 11, 1857, a group of citizens received permission from the Nebraska Territorial Legislature to found the University of Nebraska at Saratoga, Nebraska. However, when they did not complete the task of meeting in Saratoga and establishing a campus within one year they lost their permission to charter.

Today's University of Nebraska was founded in 1869 in Lincoln, Nebraska. For the first 99 years of its existence, the University was synonymous with the Lincoln campus. In 1902, Omaha Medical College became part of the University of Nebraska system. The University reorganized into its present form in 1968 when it took control of the municipal University of Omaha, which became the University of Nebraska at Omaha. Kearney State College, the University of Nebraska at Kearney, became the fourth member of the University of Nebraska system in 1991.

Governance

On January 1, 2020, Walter "Ted" Carter, Jr was appointed the 8th president of the University of Nebraska system. President Carter was the 54th President of the U.S. Naval War College, and the 62nd Superintendent of the U.S. Naval Academy.

The Board of Regents consists of eight voting members elected by district for six-year terms, and four non-voting student Regents, one from each campus, who serve during their tenure as student body president. The board supervises the general operations of the university, and the control and direction of all expenditures.

See also 
 Nebraska State College System, the other state institution of higher education

References

External links 
 

University of Nebraska
 
 
Public university systems in the United States